The 2010–11 season was Dumbarton's second consecutive season in the Scottish Second Division, having been promoted from the Scottish Third Division at the end of the 2008–09 season. Dumbarton also competed in the Challenge Cup, League Cup and the Scottish Cup.

Summary
Dumbarton finished seventh in the Second Division. They reached the first of the Scottish Challenge Cup, the first round of the League Cup and the third round of the Scottish Cup.

Management
Dumbarton began the 2010–11 season under the management of Jim Chapman. On 27 October 2010, Chapman resigned as manager, with Alan Adamson being appointed as interim manager. In April 2011, after six months as interim manager Adamson was appointed on a permanent basis.

Results & fixtures

Scottish Second Division

Scottish Challenge Cup

Scottish League Cup

Scottish Cup

Stirlingshire Cup

Pre-season Matches

League table

Player statistics

Squad 

|}

Transfers

Players in

Players out

Trivia
 The League match against Arbroath on 26 February marked Stephen Grindlay's 200th appearance for Dumbarton in all national competitions - the 30th Dumbarton player to break the 'double century'.
 The League match against East Fife on 30 October marked Ben Gordon's 100th appearance for Dumbarton in all national competitions - the 131st Dumbarton player to reach this milestone.

See also
List of Dumbarton F.C. seasons

References

External links
Michael White (Dumbarton Football Club Historical Archive)
Michael McGowan (Dumbarton Football Club Historical Archive)
Stirling Smith (Dumbarton Football Club Historical Archive)
Graham Wilson (Dumbarton Football Club Historical Archive)
Paul Maxwell (Dumbarton Football Club Historical Archive)

Dumbarton F.C. seasons
Scottish football clubs 2010–11 season